The history of nursing in the United Kingdom relates to the development of the profession since the 1850s. The history of nursing itself dates back to ancient history, when the sick were cared for in temples and places of worship. In the early Christian era, nursing in the United Kingdom was undertaken by certain women in the Christian Church, their services being extended to patients in their homes. These women had no real training by today's standards, but experience taught them valuable skills, especially in the use of herbs and folk drugs, and some gained fame as the physicians of their era.  Remnants of the religious nature of nurses remains in Britain today, especially with the retention of the job title "Sister" for a senior female nurse.

Nineteenth century
Before the advent of training, nursing was often casual and low paid.  Pay in London voluntary hospitals was between 6 shillings and 9s 6d a week, with some board and lodging.  Outside London pay was much lower.  Few nurses were described as educated.  Facilities in hospitals were poor, though some began to provide meals for nurses. The designation 'sister' occurred consequent to the ministry of religious sisters who were recruited separately from nurses and were more respectable, honest and conscientiously devoted to the welfare of patients (which often brought them into conflict with the hospital authorities). Matrons, whose work was largely administrative, were even more so. The Nursing Sisters of St John  the Divine (est.1848) and the All Saints Sisters of the Poor (1851) provided the nursing staff for several of London's largest teaching hospitals, including Kings College, Charing Cross and University College Hospitals until close to the end of the century.

Nursing in the Poor Law infirmaries, such as it was, was largely carried out by able-bodied paupers, who were not paid.  In 1866 there were a total of 53 nurses employed in the 11 metropolitan workhouses, at an average salary of £20 18s.

Florence Nightingale

Florence Nightingale is regarded as the founder of modern nursing profession.  There was no hospital training school for nurses until one was established in Kaiserwerth, Germany, in 1846. There, Nightingale received the training that enabled her in 1860 to establish, at St Thomas' Hospital in London, the first school designed primarily to train nurses rather than to provide nursing service for the hospital.

In the Crimean War against Russia, Nightingale was appointed by Sir Sidney Herbert to oversee the introduction of female nurses into the military hospitals in Turkey. In November 1854, Nightingale arrived at the Barrack Hospital at Scutari, with a party of ten nurses and ten religious sisters, Anglican and Roman Catholic. Initially the doctors did not want the nurses there and did not ask for their help, but within ten days fresh casualties arrived from the Battle of Inkermann and the nurses were fully stretched. Nightingale was horrified at what she found in the makeshift hospital: doctors reusing infected rags, the used rags just remaining in a pile, soldiers left unwashed and bleeding. She introduced sanitary protocols and reduced the casualty rate by fifty percent.

When Nightingale returned from the Crimean War in August 1856, she hid herself away from the public's attention.  For her contribution to Army statistics and comparative hospital statistics in 1860, Nightingale became the first woman to be elected a fellow of the Statistical Society.

1858–1902

Professionalisation
When state registration of the medical profession had begun in 1858, many observers pointed to the need for a similar system for nursing. That year, the Nursing Record (renamed the British Journal of Nursing in 1902), a nursing journal, called for 
"... the whole question of the Registration of trained nurses to be set forth in a succinct form before the profession and the public".  Support for the regulation of nursing began to become more widespread following the establishment of organised nurse training in 1860.

By the 1880s, the Hospitals Association (an early version of the NHS Confederation) was committed to the principle of registration for nurses. The Matrons' Committee, comprising the matrons of the leading hospitals, agreed with registration, but differed in their views of the required length of training, arguing for three years as opposed to the one supported by the Hospitals Association. In 1887, the Hospitals Association over-ruled the matrons and established a non-statutory voluntary register. At this the Matrons' Committee split between one group which supported the Hospitals Association and another faction, led by Ethel Gordon Fenwick, which opposed the new register and sought to align themselves more closely with the medical profession. Florence Nightingale, incidentally, supported neither group and was opposed to any form of regulation for nursing, believing that the essential qualities of the nurse could neither be taught, examined nor regulated.

In 1887, the group of nurses associated with Ethel Gordon Fenwick formed the British Nurses' Association, which sought "... to unite all British nurses in membership of a recognised profession and to provide for their registration on terms, satisfactory to physicians and surgeons, as evidence of their having received systematic training".

Therefore, two separate voluntary registers now existed. Whereas that maintained by the Hospitals Association was purely an administrative list, the register established by the BNA had a more explicit public protection remit.

By 1892 it was accepted in the voluntary hospitals that the matron was the head of an independent operation, controlling her own staff and reporting directly to the hospital committee.

In 1901 there were 3,170 paid nurses employed in workhouses, with about 2,000 probationers - about one nurse for 20 patients.  In total there were about 63,500 female nurses and 5,700 male nurses in England and Wales, working both in institutions and, the majority, in patients homes.  The men were almost entirely mental nurses and were not admitted to nurse training schools.  Nurses in workhouses were paid about £17 a year.  Hospital nurses in 1902 were paid around £19 a year, but the cost of maintenance, laundry, uniforms and accommodation which were provided was around £30 a year.  In domiciliary work two guineas a week with meals provided was normal pay, and the work was easier.  In hospitals 12-hour days were normal.

Princess Helena and The Royal British Nurses' Association

Princess Helena, the daughter of Queen Victoria, played a central role in sponsoring and legitimizing the profession. Helena had a firm interest in nursing, and became President of the British Nurses' Association upon its foundation in 1887. In 1891, it received the prefix "Royal", and received the Royal Charter the following year. She was a strong supporter of nurse registration, an issue that was opposed by both Florence Nightingale and leading public figures. In a speech Helena made in 1893, she made clear that the RBNA was working towards "improving the education and status of those devoted and self-sacrificing women whose whole lives have been devoted to tending the sick, the suffering, and the dying". In the same speech, she warned about opposition and misrepresentation they had encountered. Although the RBNA was in favour of registration as a means of enhancing and guaranteeing the professional status of trained nurses, its incorporation with the Privy Council allowed it to maintain a list rather than a formal register of nurses.

Following the death of Queen Victoria in 1901, the new Queen, Alexandra, insisted on replacing Helena as President of the Army Nursing Service. In accordance with rank, Helena agreed to resign in Alexandra's favour, and she retained presidency of the Army Nursing Reserve. Though thought to be merely an artefact created by society ladies, Helena exercised an efficient and autocratic regime—"if anyone ventures to disagree with Her Royal Highness she has simply said, 'It is my wish, that is sufficient.'"

The RBNA gradually went into decline following the Nurses Registration Act 1919; after six failed attempts between 1904 and 1918, the British parliament passed the bill allowing formal nurse registration. What resulted was the Royal College of Nursing (RCN), and the RBNA lost membership and dominance. Helena supported the proposed amalgamation of the RBNA with the new RCN, but that proved unsuccessful when the RBNA pulled out of the negotiations. However, Princess Helena remained active in other nursing organisations.

Military nursing
Nightingale laid the foundations of professional nursing with the principles summarised in the book Notes on Nursing. Her highly publicized exposure of the abysmal care afforded sick and wounded soldiers energized reformers. Queen Victoria in 1860 ordered a hospital to be built to train Army nurses and surgeons, the Royal Victoria Hospital. The hospital opened in 1863 in Netley and admitted and cared for military patients. Beginning in 1866, nurses were formally appointed to Military General Hospitals.

The Army Nursing Service (ANS) oversaw the work of the nurses starting in 1881. These military nurses were sent overseas beginning with the First Boer War (often called Zulu War) from 1879 to 1881. They were also dispatched to serve during the Egyptian Campaign in 1882 and the Sudan War of 1883 to 1884. During the Sudan War members of the Army Nursing Service nursed in hospital ships on the Nile as well as the Citadel in Cairo. Almost 2000 nurses served during the second Boer War, the Anglo-Boer War of 1899 to 1902, alongside nurses who were part of the colonial armies of Australia, Canada and New Zealand. They served in tented field hospitals. 23 Army Nursing sisters from Britain lost their lives from disease outbreaks.

Queen Alexandra’s Imperial Military Nursing Service.

In March 1902, Queen Alexandra’s Imperial Military Nursing Service (QAIMNS) was established and was named after Queen Alexandra, who became its President. In 1949, the QAIMNS became a corps in the British Army and was renamed as the Queen Alexandra's Royal Army Nursing Corps. Since 1950 the organisation has trained nurses, and in 1992 men were allowed to join.

The associated Queen Alexandra's Royal Army Nursing Corps Association is a registered charity. Queen Alexandra was President from 1902 until her death in 1925. The following year she was succeeded by Queen Mary.

Twentieth century timetable

1905–1919
 National Council of Nurses formed.
The First World War results in large numbers of unmarried women, many of whom devote their lives to nursing.
 College of Nursing founded in 1915. (See entries on Cooper Perry and Royal College of Nursing, Sarah Ann Swift and Sidney Browne.)
 Nurses Registration Act 1919 and the establishment of the Ministry of Health.
The pressure for state registration grew throughout the 1890s but was undermined by disagreements within the profession over the desired form and purpose of the regulatory system. In 1902, the Midwives Registration Act established the state regulation of midwives and, two years later, a House of Commons Select committee was established to consider the registration of nurses.

The committee reported in 1904 and set out a detailed and persuasive case for registration. However, the government sat on the report and took no action. Over the next decade, a number of Private Member's Bills to establish regulation were introduced but all failed to achieve significant support in Parliament.

First World War
By the beginning of the First World War in 1914, military nursing still had only a small role for women in Britain; 10,500 nurses enrolled in Queen Alexandra's Imperial Military Nursing Service (QAIMNS) and the Princess Mary's Royal Air Force Nursing Service. These services dated to 1902 and 1918, and enjoyed royal sponsorship. There also were  74,000 Voluntary Aid Detachment (VAD) nurses who had been enrolled by the Red Cross. The ranks that were created for the new nursing services were Matron-in-Chief, Principal Matron, Sister and Staff Nurses. Women joined steadily throughout the War. At the end of 1914, there were 2,223 regular and reserve members of the QAIMNS and when the war ended there were 10,404 trained nurses in the QAIMNS.

Grace McDougall (1887–1963) was the energetic commandant of the First Aid Nursing Yeomanry (FANY), which had formed in 1907 as an auxiliary to the home guard in Britain.  McDougall at one point was captured by the Germans but escaped. The British army wanted nothing to do with them so they drove ambulances and ran hospitals and casualty clearing stations for the Belgian and French armies.

The First World War provided the final impetus to the establishment of nursing regulation, partly because of the specific contribution made by nurses to the war effort and also as a reflection of the increased contribution of women more generally in society. The College of Nursing (later the Royal College of Nursing) was established in 1916 and three years later persuaded a backbench Member of Parliament (MP), Major Richard Barnett, to introduce a private members bill to establish a regulatory system. 

The bill was finally passed in December 1919 and separate Nurses Registration Acts were passed for England/Wales, Scotland and Ireland, which was still part of the United Kingdom at the time. These acts established the General Nursing Council for England and Wales and the other bodies which survived intact until the legislative changes in 1979 which were to create the UKCC and the National Boards of Nursing. Ethel Gordon Fenwick was the first nurse on the English register.

The National Asylum Workers' Union organised strikes at Prestwich Hospital, Whittingham Hospital and Bodmin Hospital in 1918. It threatened to organise strikes in all the London asylums in support of a 48-hour week in 1919. The Professional Union of Trained Nurses was founded in 1919.

1920s
In the 1921 Census 111,501 women and 11,000 men declared that they were nurses.  The registration regime stopped the very small hospitals from offering training.  The first national examination was in 1925. About 40% of the candidates failed.

The Labour Party produced its first draft policy statement on the profession in 1926, advocating a 48-hour week, the separation of training schools from hospitals and advocating that the profession should be organised on Trade Union lines.

1930s
 Foundation of the National Society of Male Nurses.
 The Royal College of Nursing gains its royal charter.
In the 1931 Census 138,670 women and 15,000 men declared that they were nurses. 88% of the women were single, 5% married and 7% widowed or divorced.

In 1930 nurses in the voluntary hospitals worked 117 hours a fortnight in London and 119 in the provinces. In 1936 the London County Council introduced a standard 54 hour week for nurses and in 1938 moved to a 96-hour fortnight.

In 1935 county councils began training courses for assistant nurses to care for the chronic sick.

In 1937 the Trades Union Congress adopted a "Nurses’ Charter", demanding a  96-hour fortnight, improvement of the amenities of nurses’ homes and arguing that nurses should be able to live out. At that time the average nurse was working 104 hours per fortnight.  The Earl of Athlone was appointed to chair a committee of inquiry into the arrangements for "recruitment, training and registration and terms and conditions of service" for nurses. It found that about 12,000 new recruits were needed each year. It recommended higher pay, a 96-hour fortnight and four weeks holiday a year, and the removal of unreasonable restrictions on nurses life. It advocated more domestic staff and that grants should be made from public funds to Voluntary hospitals to pay for these improvements.

1940s
  The Nurses Salaries Committee was established in October 1941 with Lord Rushcliffe as chair.
 Role of state enrolled nurse formally recognised, with two years' training instead of three.
 Horder Committee recommends fewer nursing schools and the introduction of inspection.
 Penicillin becomes available for civilian use.
 Numbers of male nurses increased as demobilised service men with medical experience join the profession. By 1949 there were about 1300 registered male nurses.
 The National Health Service (NHS) is launched in 1948, offering comprehensive health care for all, free at the point of delivery, but paid for through taxation.  Whitley Councils established for nursing.  Pay for student nurses was set at £200 with a deduction of £100, and for staff nurses £315, rising by increments to £415 with a deduction of £120 for board and lodging.

Second World War 1939-45
The armed forces estimated at the beginning of the war that they needed 5000 trained nurses.  Up to 67,000 were thought to be needed to care for the expected air-raid casualties.  This was more than the number of trained nurses in employment.  A Civil Nursing Reserve was set up - 7000 trained nurses, 3000 assistant nurses and also nursing auxiliaries.  The auxiliaries were given fifty hours training in hospital before they started work.
After protests it was agreed that they should not do domestic work. 6,200 from the Civil Nursing Reserve were working in hospitals in June 1940.

The Ministry of Health guaranteed a salary of £40 to nursing students in training, about double what voluntary hospitals were paying before the war.

During the war nurses belonged to Queen Alexandra's Imperial Military Nursing Service (QAIMNS), as they had during World War I, and as they remain today. (Nurses belonging to the QAIMNS are informally called "QA"s.) Members of the Army Nursing Service served in every overseas British military campaign during World War II, as well as at military hospitals in Britain. At the beginning of World War II, nurses held officer status with equivalent rank, but were not commissioned officers. In 1941, emergency commissions and a rank structure were created, conforming with the structure used in the rest of the British Army. Nurses were given rank badges and were now able to be promoted to ranks from Lieutenant through to Brigadier. Nurses were exposed to all dangers during the War, and some were captured and became prisoners of war.Two hundred and thirty-six nurses died as a consequence of the war. Five nurses who trained at the Royal Victoria Hospital Belfast, N.Ireland died in service.Ruth Hannah Dickson had served in WW1. She re-joined the QA/Rs in Singapore having been a missionary in China.The evacuation ship she was aboard was hit by a Japanese U-boat as it left Singapore. She survived the attack to be taken Prisoner of War and died in a concentration camp in 1944. Ellen Lowry and Ida Nelson were nursing with the Colonial Service in Singapore. Their ship was also attacked leaving Singapore and they drowned.Doreen Pedlow QA was aboard a ship leaving Singapore when it too was hit. Doreen drifted for three days on a raft before she died. Beatrice Dowling was serving with the Naval Nursing Service in Singapore when she too died at sea. These 5 names are on the Roll of Honour in Westminster Abbey.  the outbreak of WW2 there were 640 nurses attached to the Queen Alexandra's Imperial Military Nursing Service (QAIMNS).  By the end of the war this number had risen through the recruitment of reservists to 12,000 </ref>Brenda McBryde,Quiet Heroines, Nurses of the Second World War:1985(Chatto & Windus:The Hogarth Press)

1950s
 Large influx of Caribbean entrants into British nurse training.
 Introduction of tranquillisers transforms mental health nursing.
 Male nurses join the main nursing register in 1951.
 University of Edinburgh runs the first course for clinical nurse teachers.
 The Mental Health Act 1959 abolishes the legal separation of psychiatric hospitals, allowing those patients to be admitted to any hospital.
 By 1959 most hospital nurses were working an 88-hour fortnight.

1960s
The availability of sterile supplies brings an end to washing and sterilisation of equipment such as dressings and syringes. Edinburgh initiates the first degree in nursing. Charlotte Bentley of the "National Association of State Enrolled Assistant Nurses" worked with Irene Ward who was a member of parliament for Tynemouth and a private member's bill, the "Nurses (Amendment) Act, 1961", passed through parliament to remove the demeaning "assistant" from the State Enrolled Nurse's job title.

 The Nursing Homes Act 1963 brings registration and greater control by local authorities.
 The Salmon report calls for reform to nurse grading, initiating the end of matrons.
 Nurse Dame Cicely Saunders sets up the first hospice in 1967.
 Termination of pregnancy becomes legal under the Abortion Act 1967.
 In 1960 the University of Edinburgh was the 1st UK higher education institution to offer a pre-registration bachelor’s degree in nursing

1970s
 Nurses march to Downing Street demanding better pay, and win increases of up to 58 per cent.
 Manchester University appoints the first professor of nursing.
 The Royal College of Nursing (RCN) becomes a trade union.
 The Nursing Process establishes an ethos based on assessment, planning, implementation and evaluation.
 Reform of shift patterns begins
The Briggs Committee was established in 1970 due to pressure from the RCN to consider issues around the quality and nature of nurse training and the place of nursing within the NHS, rather than regulation per se. It reported in 1972 and recommended a number of changes to professional education.  Almost as an afterthought, Briggs also recommended the replacement of the existing regulatory structure (involving nine separate bodies across the United Kingdom) with a unified central council and separate boards in each of the four countries with specific responsibility for education. Six years of debate and delay followed before the modified Briggs proposals formed the basis of the Nurses, Midwives and Health Visitors Act 1979. This was due to the need to take account of devolution, Treasury misgivings, lack of consensus within the professions (especially from midwives), and a lack of government will to find the parliamentary time to enact the legislation.
I ask a question why can I find nothing on the first protest march to Downing Street in 1968? It was nothing to do with the RCN. An ordinary nurse organised this march and it was on TV news. I was also on this march. It caused quite a stir in the nursing profession. I would say it was instrumental in shaking up RCN. Some of us renamed the RCN as retrograde conditions for nurses.

1980s
 Mass meetings are held over pay, the state of the NHS, clinical grading and the abolition of the enrolled nurse.
 United Kingdom Central Council for Nursing, Midwifery and Health Visiting (UKCC) becomes the profession's new regulatory body in 1983.
In 1983, the UKCC was set up. Its core functions were to maintain a register of UK nurses, midwives and health visitors, provide guidance to registrants, and handle professional misconduct complaints.  At the same time, National Boards were created for each of the UK countries.  Their main functions were to monitor the quality of nursing and midwifery education courses, and to maintain the training records of students on these courses.

This structure survived with minor modifications until April 2002, when the UKCC ceased to exist and its functions were taken over by a new Nursing and Midwifery Council (NMC). The English National Board was also abolished and its quality assurance function was taken on board by the NMC. The other National Boards were also abolished, but new bodies were created in each country to take over their functions, for example, NES in Scotland.

1990s
 Reforms to training under Project 2000 begin to be implemented.
 Post-registration education is introduced.
 Nurse-led helpline NHS Direct is founded.

2000s
 Health care reforms set out in The NHS Plan.
 The Nursing and Midwifery Council takes over from the UKCC in 2002.
 Agenda for Change paves the way for a new pay structure for nurses.
 Nurse employers inspected for staff-friendly policies under Improving Working Lives and Investors in People.
 In 2005 nurse numbers hit 397,500 – an all-time high.
 Nursing students are given supernumary status throughout their three years of training.
 Thanks to increased funding, in 2006 383,000 qualified nurses and midwives were employed by the NHS, a 24% gain over 1997. 
 By 2001, nearly half of the newly registered nurses were immigrants, especially from the Philippines, India, South Africa, Australia and Nigeria, as compared to 10% in 1990,
In 2009 Healthcare Assistants (HCAs) were entitled to commission.

2010s
 In 2017 the student nurse bursary was abolished in England and Wales, resulting in a 23% fall in the number of nurse degree applicants. Northern Ireland retained the bursary and applications remained steady at an average of 10 applicants per year for every one commissioned place on an undergraduate nursing programme 
 Following the EU referendum in 2016 nurse applicants from European countries fell by 96%. In actual numbers in July 2016 1,304 nurses from the EU joined the Nursing and Midwifery Council register, whereas in April 2017 46 joined.
 Quality with compassion: the future of nursing education, (the Report of the Willis Commission on Nursing Education), was produced in 2012. This report provides an historical overview of nursing education.

See also
 Queen Alexandra's Royal Army Nursing Corps
 Royal College of Nursing

Prominent nurses

 Sidney Browne
 Edith Cavell, executed by Germans in 1915
 Margaret Cooper
 Joanna Cruickshank
 Ethel Gordon Fenwick
 Caroline Keer
 Eva Luckes
 Maud McCarthy
 Olga Nethersole 1867-1951
 Florence Nightingale
 Sarah Oram
 Rosabelle Osborne
 Edith MacGregor Rome
 Catherine Roy
 Mary Salisbury (1917-2008), Labour politician 
 Cicely Saunders (1918-2005), leader in the hospice movement
 Alicia Lloyd Still
 Sarah Swift
 Sarah Elizabeth Wardroper
 Constance Watney
 Jennifer Worth 1935–2011, author

Notes

Further reading
 Abel-Smith, Brian. A history of the nursing profession (Heinemann, 1960.)
 Abel-Smith, Brian. The Hospitals 1800–1948: A Study in Social Administration in England and Wales (Heinemann, 1964).
 Allan, P. and Jolley, M. Nursing, Midwifery and Health Visiting since 1900 (Faber, 1982). 
 Baly, Monica E., ed. (2nd ed. 1995) Nursing and Social Change online; scholarly history of British nursing by experts
 Baly, M. (1986) Florence Nightingale and the Nursing Legacy (Croom Helm, 1986)
 Baly, M. A History of the Queen’s Institute: 100 Years 1887–1987 (Croom Helm, 1987)
 Bendall, E. and Raybould, E. A History of the General Nursing Council for England and Wales 1919–1969 (H.K. Lewis, 1969)
 Bostridge, M. Florence Nightingale. The Woman and Her Legend (Penguin, 2008)
 Bradshaw, Ann. "Competence and British nursing: a view from history." Journal of Clinical Nursing 9.3 (2000): 321–329.
 Bradshaw, Ann. The Project 2000 nurse: the remaking of British general nursing, 1978-2000 (Whurr, 2001).
Cowell, B. and Wainwright, D. Behind the Blue Door: The History of the Royal College of Midwives 1881–1981 (1981) London: Bailliere Tindall. 
 Davis, C., ed.  Rewriting Nursing History (1980) London: Croom Helm.
 Dingwall, Robert, Anne Marie Rafferty, Charles Webster, eds. An Introduction to the Social History of Nursing (1988) online
 Dingwall, R. and Mclntosh, J., eds. Readings in the Sociology of Nursing (1978)  Edinburgh: Churchill Livingstone.
 Helmstadter, Carol, and Judith Godden, eds. Nursing before Nightingale, 1815-1899 (2011)
 McBride, Brenda. Quiet Heroines: Story of the Nurses of the Second World War (1985)
  McEwen, Yvonne. In the Company of Nurses: The History of the British Army Nursing Service in the Great War (2014)
 McGann, Susan. The battle of the nurses: a study of eight women who influenced the development of professional nursing, 1880–1930. Scutari Press, 1992.
 Maggs, Christopher J., ed. Nursing history: The state of the art (Routledge, 1987)
 Mumm, Susan. Stolen Daughters, Virgin Mothers: Anglican Sisterhoods in Victorian Britain (Leicester University Press, 1999)
 Santos, E.V. and Stainbrook, E. "A History of Psychiatric Nursing in the 19th Century," Journal of the History of Medicine (1949)  4#1 pp 48–74.
 Scull, A. Museums of Madness: The Social Organisation of Insanity in 19th Century England (1979)  London: Allen Lane.
 Smith, F.B. The Peoples Health 1830–1910  (Croom Helm, 1979)
 Smith, F.B. Florence Nightingale: Reputation and Power (Croom Helm, 1982).
 Solano, Diana, and Anne Marie Rafferty. "Can lessons be learned from history? The origins of the British imperial nurse labour market: A discussion paper." International journal of nursing studies 44.6 (2007): 1055–1063.
 Summers, A. "Pride and Prejudice: Ladies and Nurses in the Crimean War", History Workshop (1983)  16:33-56. extract
Summers, A. Angels and Citizens: British Women as Military Nurses 1854–1914 (Routledge & Kegan Paul, 1988)
 Sweet, Helen. "Establishing Connections, Restoring Relationships: Exploring the Historiography of Nursing in Britain," Gender and History (2007) 19#3 pp. 565–580.
 Thomas, Rob, "The Labour Market for Nurses in the UK: 1997-2006," Teaching Business & Economics (2008) 12#2 online
 Tooley,  Sarah A. The History of Nursing in the British Empire - Primary Source Edition (2014)
 Webster, C. "Nursing and the Crisis of the Early National Health Service," Bulletin of the History of Nursing Group (1985)  7:4-12.
 White, R. ed. Political Issues in Nursing: Past, Present and Future (John Wiley and Sons. 1985)

Nursing
History of medicine in the United Kingdom
History of nursing
Nursing in the United Kingdom
History of the United Kingdom by topic